Nzuzi Bundebele Toko (born 20 November 1990) is a Congolese former professional footballer who played as a midfielder. He represented the DR Congo national team. Toko holds both Swiss and DR Congo nationality; he played youth international football for the former and senior international football for the latter. 

He is best known for his time playing for Grasshopper Club Zürich, with whom he won the 2012–13 Swiss Cup.

Early and personal life
Born in Kinshasa, Zaire, Toko moved to Switzerland at the age of four.

Club career
Toko spent his early career in Switzerland for Grasshoppers II and Grasshoppers.

On 20 May 2014, Toko signed a three-year contract with English club Brighton & Hove Albion following the conclusion of his contract at Grasshoppers.
 His agent revealed that Toko had turned down a move to Russia.

On 20 January 2015, Toko agreed to mutually terminate his contract with Brighton after only eight months at the club. He signed for Turkish club Eskişehirspor the next day. He later played for FC St. Gallen and Al-Fateh, before signing with IFK Göteborg in March 2019.

Since August 2022, he played for FC Dietikon, in the 2. Liga Interregional, the fifth tier of Swiss football. On 22 February 2023, he announced his retirement from football.

International career
Toko scored on his senior international début for the DR Congo national team in a 2–0 win over Saudi Arabia in May 2010. He played in two further games for DR Congo before switching allegiance to Switzerland, a 6–3 loss against Egypt in August 2010 and a 2–0 loss in Paris against Gabon in February 2011.

In March 2011, he chose to play for Switzerland and represented the Swiss under-21 team in games against Saudi Arabia and Qatar. He later represented the under-21 team during 2013 UEFA European Under-21 Football Championship qualification.

In December 2012, he was named in DR Congo's 28-man provisional squad for the 2013 Africa Cup of Nations. Although Toko did not make the final squad, he was later called up for DR Congo's 2014 FIFA World Cup qualification campaign. He played his first competitive game for DR Congo against Libya in March 2013.

Career statistics

References

1990 births
Living people
Democratic Republic of the Congo emigrants to Switzerland
Democratic Republic of the Congo footballers
Swiss men's footballers
Footballers from Kinshasa
Association football midfielders
Democratic Republic of the Congo international footballers
Switzerland under-21 international footballers
Swiss Super League players
Süper Lig players
Saudi Professional League players
2. Bundesliga players
3. Liga players
Grasshopper Club Zürich players
Brighton & Hove Albion F.C. players
Eskişehirspor footballers
FC St. Gallen players
Al-Fateh SC players
IFK Göteborg players
Würzburger Kickers players
Swiss expatriate footballers
Democratic Republic of the Congo expatriate footballers
Democratic Republic of the Congo expatriate sportspeople in England
Swiss expatriate sportspeople in England
Expatriate footballers in England
Democratic Republic of the Congo expatriate sportspeople in Turkey
Swiss expatriate sportspeople in Turkey
Expatriate footballers in Turkey
Democratic Republic of the Congo expatriate sportspeople in Saudi Arabia
Swiss expatriate sportspeople in Saudi Arabia
Expatriate footballers in Saudi Arabia
Democratic Republic of the Congo expatriate sportspeople in Sweden
Swiss expatriate sportspeople in Sweden
Expatriate footballers in Sweden